Acronicta impressa, the impressive dagger moth or willow dagger moth, is a moth of the family Noctuidae. The species was first described by Francis Walker in 1856. It is found from western Canada to north-western Mexico.

The wingspan is about 38 mm. Adults are on wing from early to midsummer depending on the location.

Recorded food plants include bitterbrush, rose, aspen, poplar and willow.

Subspecies
Acronicta impressa impressa
Acronicta impressa emaculata

References

External links

"Acronicta impressa Walker, 1856". Pacific Northwest Moths.
"Acronicta impressa [Noctuidae]". Macromoths of Northwest Forests and Woodlands. US Geological Survey.

Acronicta
Moths of North America
Moths described in 1856